Let in the Light is a 2007 album by Shannon Wright.

Track listing
Defy This Love – 3:39
St. Pete - 3:12
You Baffle Me - 3:04
Idle Hands - 2:12
When The Light Shone Down - 3:32
Don't You Doubt Me - 3:14
In The Morning - 3:23
Steadfast and True - 3:42
They'll Kill The Actor In The End - 3:14
Louise - 2:19
Everybody's Got Their Own Part To Play - 2:44

References

2007 albums
Shannon Wright albums